Alan Streeter (30 September 1928 – 21 December 2001) was an Australian rules footballer who played with the Carlton Football Club in the Victorian Football League (VFL).

Notes

External links 

Alan Streeter's profile at Blueseum

1928 births
Carlton Football Club players
Australian rules footballers from Victoria (Australia)
2001 deaths